The Wast Hills Tunnel is a canal tunnel on the Worcester and Birmingham Canal.  Its northern portal is in Hawkesley, Birmingham. Its southern portal is in fields just outside the city's boundaries, in Worcestershire.

Construction and measurements
The Wast Hills Tunnel was built in 1796 and is 2726 yards long, making it one of the longest in the country.  There are several ventilation shafts along its length which were initially used for the tunnel's construction.  It is wide enough to accommodate two narrow boats but there is no towpath.

References 

Buildings and structures in Birmingham, West Midlands
Buildings and structures in Worcestershire
Canal tunnels in England
Canals in the West Midlands (county)
Canals in Worcestershire
Transport in Birmingham, West Midlands
Transport in Worcestershire
Tunnels in Birmingham, West Midlands
Worcester and Birmingham Canal